Ethmia haemorrhoidella is a moth in the family Depressariidae. It is found in Asia Minor, southern Russia, the Caucasus, Italy, Austria, Hungary, Slovakia, Romania, Bulgaria, Albania, North Macedonia and Greece.

References

Moths described in 1844
haemorrhoidella
Moths of Europe
Insects of Turkey